Léon Jean Aimé Larribau (2 March 1889 – 31 December 1916) was a French rugby union player, killed in action during World War 1 near Verdun.

He's buried in Nécropole Nationale de Glorieux (tomb 2810)

Larribau was a 1.60m 72 kg scrum-half who played CA Périgueux until 1912, then for Biarritz Olympique and a French international. He was renowned for his long passes.

On 19 November 1954 the Aguilera stadium in Biarritz was renamed after him.

Highlights 
 6 caps for France in 1912 (4 matches) and 1914 (2 matches)
 1 try (3 points)

External links 
 Larribau on Federation Française de Rugby website
 Larribau's military registry (fiche matricule) at Archives Départementales des Pyréenées Atlantiques

French military personnel killed in World War I
France international rugby union players
French rugby union players
1889 births
1916 deaths
Sportspeople from Pyrénées-Atlantiques
French-Basque people
Biarritz Olympique players
Rugby union scrum-halves